Mathematics Made Difficult is a book by Carl E. Linderholm that uses advanced mathematical methods to prove results normally shown using elementary proofs.  Although the aim is largely satirical, it also shows the non-trivial mathematics behind operations normally considered obvious, such as numbering, counting, and factoring integers. Linderholm discusses these seemingly-obvious ideas using concepts like categories and monoids.

As an example, the proof that 2 is a prime number starts:
It is easily seen that the only numbers between 0 and 2, including 0 but excluding 2, are 0 and 1.  Thus the remainder left by any number on division by 2 is either 0 or 1.  Hence the quotient ring Z/2Z, where 2Z is the ideal in Z generated by 2, has only the elements [0] and [1], where these are the images of 0 and 1 under the canonical quotient map.  Since [1] must be the unit of this ring, every element of this ring except [0] is a unit, and the ring is a field ...

References

Mathematics books
Satirical books
1972 non-fiction books